Raúl Martínez Colomer (born April 11, 1988 in Humacao, Puerto Rico) is a Puerto Rican swimmer. He competed at the 2012 Summer Olympics in the Men's 200 metre freestyle, finishing in 38th place in the heats, failing to qualify for the semi-finals.

References

Living people
Puerto Rican male swimmers
1988 births
Olympic swimmers of Puerto Rico
People from Humacao, Puerto Rico
Swimmers at the 2012 Summer Olympics
Puerto Rican male freestyle swimmers
Swimmers at the 2011 Pan American Games
Pan American Games competitors for Puerto Rico
20th-century Puerto Rican people
21st-century Puerto Rican people